Osprey class may refer to:

 , a class of five British Royal Navy composite screw-driven sloops, designed in 1874. 
 , a class of twelve US Navy fibreglass coastal minehunters in service from 1993 to 2007 and now active with six other navies.
 , a class of Chinese torpedo retrieval submersibles.